Oberea nigriventris is a species of beetle in the family Cerambycidae. It was described by Henry Walter Bates in 1873. It is known from Malaysia, Japan, Laos, Vietnam, China, Myanmar, and Taiwan.

Subspecies
 Oberea nigriventris tenuata Pascoe, 1866
 Oberea nigriventris nigriventris Bates, 1873

References

Beetles described in 1873
nigriventris